Veneration, or veneration of saints, is the act of honoring a saint, a person who has been identified as having a high degree of sanctity or holiness. Angels are shown similar veneration in many religions. Etymologically, "to venerate" derives from the Latin verb, meaning 'to regard with reverence and respect'. Veneration of saints is practiced, formally or informally, by adherents of some branches of all major religions, including Christianity, Judaism, Hinduism, Islam, Buddhism and Jainism.

Within Christianity, veneration is practiced by groups such as the Eastern Orthodox Church, the Roman Catholic, and Eastern Catholic Churches, all of which have varying types of canonization or glorification procedures. In the Catholic and Orthodox Churches, veneration is shown outwardly by respectfully bowing or making the sign of the cross before a saint's icon, relics, or statue, or by going on pilgrimage to sites associated with saints. In general, veneration is not practiced by Protestants and Jehovah's Witnesses, as many Protestants believe the practice amounts to idolatry. Some Anglicans and Lutherans retain veneration of saints in the naming of churches, feast day celebrations and canonisation.

Hinduism has a long tradition of veneration of saints, expressed toward various gurus and teachers of sanctity, both living and dead. Branches of Buddhism include formal liturgical worship of saints, with Mahayana Buddhism classifying degrees of sainthood.

In Islam, veneration of saints is practiced by some of the adherents of traditional Islam (Sufis, for example), and in many parts of places like Turkey, Egypt, South Asia, and Southeast Asia. Other sects, such as Wahhabists etc., abhor the practice.

In Judaism, there is no classical or formal recognition of saints, but there is a long history of reverence shown toward biblical heroes and martyrs. Jews in some regions, for example in Morocco, have a long and widespread tradition of saint veneration.

Buddhism
Both main branches of Buddhism, Theravada and Mahayana, recognize those who have achieved a high degree of enlightenment as an Arhat. Mahayana Buddhism particularly gives emphasis to the power of saints to aid ordinary people on the path to enlightenment. Those who have reached enlightenment, and have delayed their own complete enlightenment in order to help others, are called Bodhisattvas. Mahayana Buddhism has formal liturgical practices for venerating saints, along with very specific levels of sainthood. Tibetan Buddhists venerate especially holy lamas, such as the Dalai Lama, as saints.

Christianity
Veneration towards those who were considered holy began in early Christianity, with the martyrs first being given special honor. Official commemoration of saints in churches began as early as the first century. The apostle Paul mentioned saints by name in his writings. Icons depicting saints were created in the catacombs. The Orthodox church of Byzantine began official church commemoration very early and even in Rome, commemoration is documented in the third century. Over time, the honor also began to be given to those Christians who lived lives of holiness and sanctity. Various denominations venerate and determine saints in different ways, with some having a formal canonization or glorification process. It is also the first step to becoming a saint.

Latria, dulia, and hyperdulia 

Christian theologians have long adopted the terms latria for the type of worship due to God alone, and dulia and proskynesis for the veneration given to angels, saints, relics and icons.

Catholic and Eastern Orthodox theologies also include the term hyperdulia for the types of veneration specifically paid to Mary. The Catholic theologian Thomas Aquinas specifies that hyperdulia is the same type of veneration as dulia, only given in a greater degree; both remain distinct from latria.

Catholicism 

In Catholicism, veneration is a type of honor distinct from the true worship (veritable adoration), which is due to God alone. According to Mark Miravelle, of the Franciscan University of Steubenville, the English word "worship" has been associated with both veneration and adoration:
As St. Thomas Aquinas once explained, adoration, which is known as latria in classical theology, is the worship and homage that is rightly offered to God alone. It is the manifestation of submission, and acknowledgement of dependence, appropriately shown towards the excellence of an uncreated divine person and to his absolute Lordship. It is the worship of the Creator that God alone deserves. Although we see in English a broader usage of the word “adoration” which may not refer to a form of worship exclusive to God—for example, when a husband says that he “adores his wife”—in general it can be maintained that adoration is the best English denotation for the worship of latria.

Veneration, known as dulia in classical theology, is the honor and reverence appropriately due to the excellence of a created person. Excellence exhibited by created beings likewise deserves recognition and honor. We see a general example of veneration in events like the awarding of academic awards for excellence in school, or the awarding of Olympic medals for excellence in sports. There is nothing contrary to the proper adoration of God when we offer the appropriate honor and recognition that created persons deserve based on achievement in excellence.

We must make a further clarification regarding the use of the term “worship” in relation to the categories of adoration and veneration. Historically, schools of theology have used the term “worship” as a general term which included both adoration and veneration. They would distinguish between “worship of adoration” and “worship of veneration.” The word “worship” (in a similar way to how the liturgical term “cult” is traditionally used) was not synonymous with adoration, but could be used to introduce either adoration or veneration. Hence Catholic sources will sometimes use the term “worship” not to indicate adoration, but only the worship of veneration given to Mary and the saints.

According to the Catechism of the Catholic Church:

In the Roman Catechism a more lengthy statement on The Honour and Invocation of the Saints is available.

Now, the Roman Catholic tradition has a well established philosophy for the veneration of the Virgin Mary via the field of Mariology with Pontifical schools such as the Marianum specifically devoted to this task.

For the doctrine of the Roman Catholic Church, in addition to the dogma of her Divine Motherhood, the Mother of God (aka "Theotokos") was the subject of three other different dogmas:
 Immaculate Conception (absence of the original sin, by grace of God) 
 Perpetual virginity (before, during, and after the birth of Jesus, until her Assumption) 
 Assumption (in body and soul to Heaven).
The special graces accorded by God to Mary motivated her title of Mediatrix of all graces to the humanity, her intercessory ability to Jesus Christ God about the believers' intentions of prayer.

In the Catholic Church there are many different forms of veneration of saints; such as the pilgrimage to a grave; such as those of Saint Peter (Vatican), Saint Anthony of Padua (Italy), Santiago de Compostela (Spain), or Holy Sepulchre (Israel). It is also usual to make a pilgrimage to places associated with the life of a saint; the Cave of Santo Hermano Pedro (Spain), the Cave of the Apocalypse (Greece) or the Aya Tekla Church (Turkey). Veneration of images and relics; Lord of Miracles (Peru), the Virgin of Guadalupe and Saint Jude Thaddaeu (Mexico), Holy Dexter (Hungary), Reliquary of the Three Kings (Germany), etc.

Oriental Orthodoxy 
In the Syriac Orthodox Church liturgical service, the Hail Mary is pronounced as a prefatory prayer after the Our Father, and before the priest's entrance to the chancel. The name of the Blessed Virgin Mary has also been probably used for the sanctification of altars, above the name of all other saints.

Eastern Orthodoxy 
In the Eastern Orthodox church veneration of the saints is important element of worship. Most services are closed with the words “Most holy Theotokos, save us!" and would use Troparions and Kontakions to venerate the saint of the day. This practice of venerating saints both through praise and by means of their icons is defended in St John Damascene's book On Holy Images, and was the subject of the Second Council of Nicaea.

Protestant

In Protestant  churches, veneration is sometimes considered to amount to the heresy of idolatry, and the related practice of canonization amounts to the heresy of apotheosis. Protestant theology usually denies that any real distinction between veneration and worship can be made, and claims that the practice of veneration distracts the Christian soul from its true object, the worship of God.  In his Institutes of the Christian Religion, John Calvin writes that "(t)he distinction of what is called dulia and latria was invented for the very purpose of permitting divine honours to be paid to angels and dead men with apparent impunity". Veneration is, therefore, considered a type of blasphemy by Luther and some Protestants. However, some Protestant streams, particularly Anglicanism and Lutheranism, allow the veneration of saints in a manner similar to Catholicism.

Biblical Support
The veneration of the memory of the holy patriarchs and prophets is recorded in the Book of Sirach: "Let us now praise men of renown, and our fathers in their generation" (44:1). "And their names continue for ever, the glory of the holy men remaining unto their children" (44:15)

In terms of venerating relics of saints, the following two verses are frequently mentioned:
'Once while some Israelites were burying a man, suddenly they saw a band of raiders; so they threw the man’s body into Elisha’s tomb. When the body touched Elisha’s bones, the man came to life and stood up on his feet.' (2 Kings 13:21, NIV).

'God did extraordinary miracles through Paul, so that even handkerchiefs and aprons that had touched him were taken to the sick, and their illnesses were cured and the evil spirits left them.' (Acts 19:11, 12, NIV). 

St. Augustine, St. Ambrose, and others, give accounts of miracles that occurred at the graves of St. Stephen, St. Felix of Nola, St. Gervasius, and many others, in post-Biblical times. Such miraculous events are seen as divine favor for the veneration of relics.

Hinduism
Hinduism has a longstanding and living tradition of reverence toward sants (saints) and mahatmas (ascended masters), with the line often blurring between humanity and divinity in the cases of godmen and godwomen.

Islam 

Islam has had a rich history of veneration of saints (often called wali, which literally means "Friend [of God]"), which has declined in some parts of the Islamic world in the twentieth century due to the influence of the various streams of Salafism. In Sunni Islam, the veneration of saints became a very common form of religious celebration early on, and saints came to be defined in the eighth-century as a group of "special people chosen by God and endowed with exceptional gifts, such as the ability to work miracles." The classical Sunni scholars came to recognize and honor these individuals as venerable people who were both "loved by God and developed a close relationship of love to Him." The vast majority of saints venerated in the classical Sunni world were the Sufis, who were all Sunni mystics who belonged to one of the four orthodox legal schools of Sunni law.

Veneration of saints eventually became one of the most widespread Sunni practices for more than a millennium, before it was opposed in the twentieth century by the Salafi movement, whose various streams regard it as "being both un-Islamic and backwards ... rather than the integral part of Islam which they were for over a millennium."  In a manner similar to the Protestant Reformation, the specific traditional practices which Salafism has tried to curtail in both Sunni and Shia contexts include those of the veneration of saints, visiting their graves, seeking their intercession, and honoring their relics. As Christopher Taylor has remarked: "[Throughout Islamic history] a vital dimension of Islamic piety was the veneration of Muslim saints…. [due, however to] certain strains of thought within the Islamic tradition itself, particularly pronounced in the nineteenth and the twentieth centuries ... [some modern day] Muslims have either resisted acknowledging the existence of Muslim saints altogether or have viewed their presence and veneration as unacceptable deviations."

Judaism

While orthodox and organized Judaism do not countenance the veneration of saints per se, veneration and pilgrimage to burial sites of holy Jewish leaders is an ancient part of the tradition.

It is common for some Jews to visit the graves of many righteous Jewish leaders. The tradition is particularly strong among Moroccan Jews, and Jews of Sephardi descent, although also by some Ashkenazi Jews as well. This is particularly true in Israel, where many holy Jewish leaders are buried. The Cave of the Patriarchs in Hebron, Rachel's Tomb in Bethlehem and that of Maimonides in Tiberius are examples of burial sites that attract large pilgrimages in Israel. In America, the only such example is the grave site of Rabbi Menachem Mendel Schneerson, at the Ohel, in the cemetery in Queens where he is buried alongside his father-in-law. During his lifetime, Schneerson himself would frequently visit the gravesite (Ohel) of his father-in-law, where he would read letters and written prayers, and then place them on the grave. Today visitors to the grave of Schneerson include Jews of Orthodox, Reform and Conservative background, as well as non-Jews. Visitors typically recite prayers of psalms and bring with them petitions of prayers written on pieces of paper which are then torn and left on the grave.

Jainism
In Jainism, it recognizes the tirthankaras, which are beings who have achieved transcendence and liberation (moksha) and are, therefore, teachers who taught the Jain path. Away from the evolution of the cosmos and the cosmic event, they do not intervene in any way in it, they serve only as examples to follow. The latter is manifested in the offering ceremonies (Devapuja), which constitute more of a renunciation on the part of the believer than a surrender, since the tirthankaras are totally indifferent to the affairs of men and the Jains assume that they are indifferent to them.

See also
 Genuflection
 Hagiography
 Iconography
 Intercession of saints
 Mary, mother of Jesus
 Muhammad in Islam
 Patron saint
 Rachel's Tomb
 Relic
 Shrine
 Tzadik
 Veneration of the dead

References

Notes

External links
ON THE INVOCATION, VENERATION, AND RELICS, OF SAlNTS, AND ON SACRED IMAGES. Roman Catholic teaching from the Council of Trent (1545–63)
"Dulia" from the Catholic Encyclopedia (1911)

Catholic spirituality
Christian terminology
Eastern Orthodox spirituality
Religious practices
Sainthood